This is a list of the main career statistics of Slovakian tennis player Magdaléna Rybáriková.

Performance timelines

Singles

Doubles

WTA career finals

Singles: 8 (4 titles, 4 runner-ups)

Doubles: 2 (1 title, 1 runner-up)

ITF Circuit finals

Singles: 17 (9 titles, 8 runner–ups)

Record against top-10 players

Top 10 wins

Notes

References 

Rybáriková, Magdaléna